Ferenc is a given name of Hungarian origin. It is a cognate of Francis, Francisco, Francesco, François, Frank and Franz. People with the name include:
 Ferenc Batthyány, Hungarian magnate and general
 Ferenc Berényi, Hungarian artist
 Ferenc Csik,  Hungarian swimmer 
 Ferenc Deák (politician), Hungarian statesman, Minister of Justice
 Ferenc Erkel, Hungarian composer and conductor
 Ferenc Farkas de Boldogfa (1713–1770), Hungarian nobleman
 Ferenc Farkas (Jesuit priest), Hungarian Jesuit priest
 Ferenc Farkas (Zala county auditor), Hungarian nobleman
 Ferenc Farkas, Hungarian composer
 Ferenc Fricsay, Hungarian conductor
 Ferenc Gyurcsány, Hungarian Prime Minister
 Ferenc Karinthy, Hungarian writer and translator
 Ferenc Kölcsey, Hungarian poet, literary critic, orator, politician
 Ferenc Koncz, Hungarian politician
 Ferenc Liszt (1811–1886), Hungarian composer and conductor known as Franz Liszt
 Ferenc Mádl, Hungarian legal scholar, politician, professor
 Ferenc Molnár, Hungarian author
 Ferenc Móra, Hungarian novelist, journalist, and museologist
 Ferenc Paragi, Hungarian track and field athlete
 Ferenc Puskás, Hungarian footballer
 Ferenc Rados (born 1934), Hungarian pianist
 Ferenc Szekeres, Hungarian long-distance runner
 Ferenc Szálasi, Hungarian politician, the leader of the Arrow Cross Party 
 Ferenc Weisz (1885–1943), Hungarian footballer 
 Paul Ferenc, fictional character in Far Cry 2

Ferencz 
"Ferencz" is an old spelling of "Ferenc":
 János Ferencz Fetzer
 Ferenc Gyulay (1799–1868), Austrian-Hungarian nobleman
  (born 1973)
 Ferenc József, Prince Koháry de Csábrág et Szitnya (1767–1826), Hungarian nobleman
 Steven (István) Ferencz Udvar-Házy
 Benjamin Berell Ferencz, Transsylvania-born Jewish American lawyer
  (born 1944), Hungarian architect
 Károly Ferencz (1913–1984), Hungarian Olympic sport wrestler
  (born 1961), Hungarian chemical engineer
 Réka Ferencz (born 1989), birthname of Romanian biathlete Réka Forika

See also 
 Ferenci (disambiguation)

Hungarian masculine given names
Surnames